Ubaldo Aguilar Flores (born 16 May 1959) is a Mexican politician affiliated with the Institutional Revolutionary Party. As of 2014 he served as Deputy of the LIX Legislature of the Mexican Congress representing Veracruz.

References

1959 births
Living people
Politicians from Veracruz
Deputies of the LIX Legislature of Mexico
Institutional Revolutionary Party politicians
Universidad Veracruzana alumni
21st-century Mexican politicians
Members of the Chamber of Deputies (Mexico) for Veracruz